Spy Today, Die Tomorrow (also known as Die Slowly, You'll Enjoy It More) is a 1967 German-Italian-Spanish Eurospy film written and directed by Franz Josef Gottlieb and starring Lex Barker.

Plot

Cast

References

External links

1967 films
1960s spy thriller films
German spy thriller films
Italian spy thriller films
Spanish spy thriller films
West German films
Films directed by Franz Josef Gottlieb
Films about nuclear war and weapons
Films based on German novels
1960s German-language films
1960s Italian films
1960s German films